48 Hours may refer to:

Film and television 
 48 Hrs., a 1982 American action comedy film, starring Nick Nolte and Eddie Murphy
 48 Hours (TV program), an American news/documentary TV program that has aired on CBS since 1988
 "48 Hours" (Brooklyn Nine-Nine), a television episode
 "48 Hours" (Stargate SG-1), a television episode
 48 Hour Film Project, a short-film competition
 48Hours, a filmmaking competition in New Zealand
 The First 48, an American documentary TV program

Music 
 48 Hours (album), an unreleased album by Frank-N-Dank
 48 Hours (song), a song by Blue System
 "48 Hours", a song by The Clash from the 1977 album The Clash
 "48 Hours", a song by the Vengaboys from the 2000 album The Platinum Album
 "48Hrs", a song by Disciples released in 2018

Other 
 Surgères 48 Hour Race, an ultrarunning race (1985–2010)